Bolivia-Venezuela Relations are the existing bilateral relations between the Plurinational State of Bolivia and the Bolivarian Republic of Venezuela. Both nations established their diplomatic relations on 14 September 1883, during the government of the President of Bolivia Narciso Campero Leyes and the government of the President of Venezuela Antonio Guzmán Blanco. Currently, Bolivia has an embassy in the city of Caracas and Venezuela has an embassy in the city of La Paz.

Both sovereign republics of South America are full members of the Organization of American States (OAS), the United Nations Economic Commission for Latin America and the Caribbean (ECLAC) and the Ibero-American Community of Nations (CIN). It is worth mentioning that in November 2019 the temporary interim government of President Jeanine Áñez broke diplomatic relations with the presidency of Nicolás Maduro, recognizing interim President Juan Guaidó in his place. But just one year later, the constitutional government of President Luis Arce decided to reestablish relations with Venezuela since November 2020.

History

Spanish domain 
Both Latin American nations share a common past, the current Bolivian and Venezuelan territories were part of the Spanish Empire, being administered separately: the Province of Charcas (later Alto Peru) and the Captaincy General of Venezuela, respectively. In addition to being Spanish one of the official languages in both countries.

21st century 
Under the presidency of Evo Morales, bilaterals relations with the presidency of Hugo Chávez and later Nicolás Maduro, were narrowed due to an affinity in ideological matters. Both countries maintained an active participation in the Bolivarian Alliance for the Peoples of Our America (ALBA-TCP), until Bolivia's departure from the organization in November 2019.

During the interim presidency of Jeanine Áñez, the country broke diplomatic relations with the presidency of Nicolás Maduro, and recognized Juan Guaidó as interim president of Venezuela.

After the resignation of the government of Evo Morales on 10 November 2019, the next day, hooded men took over the Venezuelan embassy in La Paz for a few hours armed with dynamite. On 15 November 2019, the constitutional president of Bolivia, Jeanine Áñez, broke diplomatic relations with the government of Nicolás Maduro, recognizing Juan Guaidó in his place. On 16 November of the same year, a group of Venezuelan opponents met outside the Bolivian embassy in Caracas to give their support for Añez, while Juan Guaidó held that same day a videoconference with Jeanine Áñez to express their mutual support.

Cooperation 

During its great economic boom, as a result of the high prices of a barrel of oil, Venezuela cooperated with Bolivia, giving away tractors, heavy machinery, asphalt, airplanes, helicopters, ambulances, computers, vehicles and motorcycles for the Bolivian Police and presidential security. Likewise, the Venezuelan cooperation financed the renovation of several Bolivian barracks and gave the initial impulse to the "Bolivia Cambia, Evo Cumple" program (Bolivia Changes, Evo Meets), financing said program from 2007 to 2011.

Agricultural area 
In February 2007, the President of Venezuela Hugo Chávez Frías decides to give Bolivia some 320 new "VENIRAN" brand tractors (which were of Venezuelan-Iranian manufacture) fresh from the factory located in Ciudad Bolivar in the Estado Bolivar, this with the objective of developing and strengthening the agricultural sector of the Bolivian rural area. Bolivian President Evo Morales Ayma thanked the Venezuelan donation and decided to distribute those 320 tractors among the departments of La Paz, Cochabamba, Santa Cruz, Tarija, Beni and Oruro.

It is estimated that the donation of the 320 Venezuelan tractors to Bolivia was valued at around 11.4 million dollars (each tractor was worth approximately around 35 thousand dollars). But a short time later, the mayors of that time of the different Bolivian municipalities that received the donation, complained to the Bolivian press that said tractors were incomplete because they did not have their respective plows. The then Ministry of Rural Development and Lands of Bolivia indicated that it was already the obligation of the municipal governments to complete the accessories that were missing from said machines, since the cost of each plow did not exceed 800 dollars per unit. In the end, due to the lack of state control and municipal mismanagement, several of those Venezuelan tractors ended up in the private hands of mayors and councilors or municipal public officials of the different mayors of Bolivia.

Infrastructure Area 

In 2004, Venezuelan President Hugo Chávez decided to give the mayor of the city of La Paz some 3,000 tons of asphalt for the paving of some streets in the La Paz city. The then mayor Juan del Granado thanked the Venezuelan donation.

On July 30, 2007, Venezuela gave a large amount of heavy machinery to Bolivia, valued at about 12 million dollars for the reconstruction of several affected areas throughout the Department of Beni due to the natural disasters caused by the "El Niño Phenomenon". Among the heavy machinery that Venezuela donated to the people from Beni, there were about 4 excavators, 3 backhoes, 4 loaders, 4 compactors, 2 motor graders, 2 crawler loaders, 20 trucks, 2 vans, 3 tanks with a capacity for 15,000 liters of water each one and economic resources for the construction of a 120 ton-per-hour asphalt processing plant.

Health area 
In August 2009, Chávez gave Bolivia some 170 ambulances to improve the Bolivian health system. President Evo Morales Ayma distributed those ambulances among the 87 municipalities of the Department of La Paz (2 ambulances for each municipality).

But this donation generated harsh criticism from the Venezuelan opposition, as Venezuelan opponents accused then-President Chávez of giving ambulances to other countries when there is a serious shortage of ambulances in Venezuela and this was reflected in the tragic explosion of amuay oil refinery in Estado Falcón where unfortunately around 55 Venezuelans died and more than 150 people were injured, and in the absence of ambulances, the dead had to be transferred to morgues, piled up in old trucks and open to the open air.

Faced with this situation, Venezuelan opponents from Anzoátegui state appeared before the Bolivian Embassy in Caracas, to ask Bolivia to return to Venezuela at least 20 ambulances of the 170 that had been given away by Chávez, but such request was never heard by the Bolivian government.

Security area 
On 1 November 2008, Venezuelan President Hugo Chávez decided to give Bolivia some 16 late-model Toyota wagon vehicles valued at $552,000 dollars (each car cost around $34,500 dollars) to equip and strengthen the presidential security of the President of Bolivia Evo Morales Ayma, in addition to also donating about 6 Kawasaki brand motorcycles. But it had not been long when on May 4, 2010, the Bolivian press made known to the entire public opinion of the country that one of the vehicles that Chávez gave to Evo Morales had been stolen while the presidential driver went to buy bread to the neighborhood store, which sparked a national scandal in Bolivia and also internationally. In turn, the Bolivian government admitted that a presidential security vehicle had been stolen due to the driver's carelessness but clarified that said stolen vehicle did not belong to the Venezuelan donation but was a "1996 model" wagon that belonged to the Ministry of the Presidency since 1997.

Defense area 
Venezuela's cooperation with Bolivia in the defense area dates back several decades. In 1973 and during his first government, the President of Venezuela Rafael Caldera Rodríguez decided to give Bolivia some 9 semi-used North American F-86 "Saber" fighter jets (manufactured in the United States) with the aim of strengthening the Air Force Boliviana (FAB). It should be remembered that in 1955, Venezuela had bought some 30 aircraft of this model from the United States, but by the early 1970s the then Venezuelan Air Force was already withdrawing them from air service due to their age. 

It is then that on 13 October 1973, the first six Venezuelan F-86 "Saber" planes arrived in the city of La Paz and the remaining three arrived on 22 June 1974 in the midst of the dictatorship of Hugo Banzer, who thanked the donation. These Venezuelan aircraft were at the service of the FAB, flying for around another 20 more years (until 1994) when the first government of Bolivian President Gonzalo Sanchez de Lozada decided to withdraw them from service and sell them to private air show companies in the United States or to collectors private from that country.

In 2003, the President of Venezuela Hugo Chávez decided to give away 11 semi-used military training aircraft Beechcraft T-34 Mentor to Bolivia with the aim of strengthening the Bolivian Air Force (FAB). Although it should be remembered that these aircraft (of American manufacture) had begun to fly for the first time in the United States already during the 1950s and had been acquired by Venezuela in the 1970s.

The 11 T-34 aircraft arrived in Bolivia on 31 July 2004 during the government of then Bolivian President Carlos Mesa, who thanked the Venezuelan donation. Venezuelan aircraft were at the service of the FAB, flying for about 15 more years (until 2018) when the decision was made to withdraw them from service due to their excessive age and lack of spare parts.

On 28 May  2006, Chávez decided to give two Super Puma Helicopters (of French manufacture) to Bolivia to equip and strengthen the Bolivian presidential transport, as it should be remembered that on 1 March 2006, the old helicopter in the one transported by President Evo Morales Ayma had suffered a serious damage when landing in Cochabamba from a flight from Orinoca, this due to the age of the Bolivian helicopter.

The Venezuelan helicopters arrived in the city of La Paz on 7 June 2006. One of the "Super Puma" helicopters crashed on 20 July 2008 in the town of Colomi when he tried to make a trip from Cochabamba to the city of Cobija. Four Venezuelan soldiers and one Bolivian died in the accident. During that time, sectors related to the MAS-IPSP came to describe the event as an attempt on the life of President Evo Morales Ayma. However, the Bolivian Air Force (FAB) ruled out any hypothesis of an alleged attack in the fall of the presidential helicopter.

On 28 February 2007,Chávez decided to give away another two Aérospatiale SA316 Alouette III helicopters (of French manufacture) to Bolivia, with the aim of helping in humanitarian rescue and rescue tasks in the floods that the Beni Department was suffering. during that year.

That same year, one of the "Alouette III" helicopters crashed on 28 June 2008 in the Molle Molle area in the south of the city of Cochabamba. In the accident, four Bolivian soldiers and one Venezuelan were killed. The Bolivian opposition of that time harshly criticized the government of Evo Morales for receiving old helicopters in poor condition or without good operating conditions, since the crashed helicopter had left the factory in 1972 and by 2007 it was more than 35 years old. In turn, the Venezuelan embassy in Bolivia indicated that Venezuela would be unable to donate defective helicopters where the lives of Venezuelan military personnel would also be put at risk. On the other hand, in the face of the national scandal, President Evo Morales Ayma only limited himself to asking the FAB for a detailed report and a detailed description of the plane crash, in order to take new measures.

References

External links 

 

 
Venezuela
Bilateral relations of Venezuela